Saïda is a province (wilaya) of Algeria, named after its capital.

History
The province was created from parts of Oran department, Saïda province and Saoura province in 1974.

In 1984 El Bayadh Province and Naama Province were carved out of its territory.

Administrative divisions
The province is divided into 6 districts (daïras), which are further divided into 16 communes or municipalities.

Districts

 Aïn El Hadjar
 El Hassasna
 Ouled Brahim
 Saïda
 Sidi Boubekeur
 Youb

Communes

 Aïn El Hadjar
 Aïn Sekhouna
 Aïn Soltane
 Doui Thabet
 El Hassasna
 Hounet
 Maamora
 Moulay Larbi
 Ouled Brahim
 Ouled Khaled
 Saïda
 Sidi Ahmed
 Sidi Amar
 Sidi Boubekeur
 Tircine
 Youb

References

 
Provinces of Algeria
States and territories established in 1974